Marika Koroibete (born 26 July 1992) is a dual-code international rugby league and rugby union footballer. He has been capped for Australia's national rugby union team, and plays as a winger for the Melbourne Rebels in Super Rugby. 

Koroibete previously played rugby league for the Melbourne Storm and Wests Tigers in the NRL, and was a member of the Fiji national rugby league team.

Early years
Born in Naraiyawa, Fiji, Koroibete grew up on a remote family farm. Koroibete started his career playing for Nasinu Secondary School in rugby union in Fiji.

After a short stint in junior rugby league , Koroibete signed a 3-year contract with the Wests Tigers to play in Australia, initially in the Toyota Cup national under-20 competition. He was signed after being spotted playing for the Fiji Under 19s in a match against Australian-born Fijian players.  Koroibete had also been considering pursuing a career in sprinting, having run 100 metres in 10.75 seconds.

He played for the Tigers' Toyota Cup team in 2011 and 2012, scoring 22 tries in 26 games. He scored two tries as the team won the 2012 Grand Final. 2012 Toyota Cup coach Todd Payten said, "The most exciting part with Marika is that we're only really scratching the surface. He's got a couple of little issues and once we iron them out, he's certainly going to be a crowd pleaser."

Club career

Wests Tigers
In Round 21 of 2012, Koroibete made his NRL debut on the wing for the Wests Tigers against the South Sydney Rabbitohs in the Tigers 32-6 loss. In just his second game in Round 22, Koroibete scored 4 tries for the Tigers against the 51-26 win Parramatta Eels at Campbelltown Stadium, equaling the club record for most tries in a match set by Kevin McGuinness ten years earlier. Koroibete then followed up with 2 tries against the Canterbury-Bankstown Bulldogs a fortnight later.

Coach Tim Sheens described him as having, "lots of issues still but he's got raw pace and ability." Koroibete finished his debut year in the NRL playing in 6 matches and scored 7 tries. On 21 August 2012, Koroibete was named at wing in the 2012 Toyota Cup Team of the Year. Koroibete was also named the joint Rookie of the Year for the Wests Tigers, and one of the top ten upcoming youngsters in the NRL in Lifestyle Uncut Magazine.

A number of injuries, including a fractured eye-socket and a dislocated elbow, saw Koroibete play in just 9 games in 2013. However, he scored 5 tries and was averaging over three tackle breaks and 100 metres with the ball per game.

In February, Koroibete was included in the Wests Tigers inaugural 2014 Auckland Nines squad, despite having a problem with his visa to gain entry into New Zealand.

Melbourne Storm
Koroibete joined the Melbourne Storm mid-season on a -year contract effective from 23 June 2014. In Round 18 against the Canterbury-Bankstown Bulldogs, Koroibete made his debut for the Melbourne Storm replacing Sisa Waqa on the wing in the Storm's 6–4 loss. In the next match in Round 19 against the Canberra Raiders at AAMI Park, Koroibete scored his first club try in the 28–14 win. Koroibete played in 10 matches and scored 6 tries for the Storm in 2014 after his mid-year transfer to the club.

He finished the 2015 season as the Storms' highest try-scorer with 16 tries in 23 matches. Koroibete also played for the Storm at the NRL Auckland Nines in 2015, and 2016. In May 2016 it was confirmed that he would switch codes to play rugby union at the end of the 2016 NRL season.

Melbourne Rebels
Koriobete accepted a contract offer to join Super Rugby side the Melbourne Rebels for the 2017 season. The offer allowed him to play for the Rebels as well as for the Australian national team the Wallabies for which he had already qualified under the 4-year residency rule.

Super Rugby statistics

International career

Rugby league: Fiji
Koroibete made his international debut for Fiji at the 2013 World Cup, as Fiji defeated Ireland 32-14. He played in all five of Fiji's games. In the match against Samoa, he made seven tackle breaks and ran over 220 metres with the ball.

The following year Koroibete was selected to play for Fiji in the 2014 Pacific Rugby League International against Samoa. He played on the wing in the 32–16 loss at Penrith Stadium.

On 2 May 2015, he played for Fiji against Papua New Guinea in the 2015 Melanesian Cup, playing on the wing. He scored 2 tries in a Man of the Match performance in Fiji's 22-10 victory at Cbus Super Stadium.

Rugby union: Australia
In October 2016, just weeks after playing in the 2016 NRL Grand Final, Koroibete was named in the Wallabies squad for their end-of-year tour to Europe. He did not play in the test matches but gained his first appearance playing for the Australia XV side against the French Barbarians team in Bordeaux.

Koroibete made his test debut for Australia against  at Canberra on 16 September 2017.

References

External links

2015 Melbourne Storm profile

1992 births
Living people
Australia international rugby union players
Australian rugby union players
Balmain Ryde-Eastwood Tigers players
Dual-code rugby internationals
Expatriate rugby league players in Australia
Expatriate rugby union players in Australia
Fiji national rugby league team players
Fijian expatriates in Australia
Fijian rugby league players
I-Taukei Fijian people
Melbourne Rebels players
Melbourne Rising players
Melbourne Storm players
People from Namosi Province
Rugby league wingers
Rugby union wings
Wests Tigers NSW Cup players
Wests Tigers players
Saitama Wild Knights players